Arthur Allen Hoag (January 28, 1921 - July 17, 1999) was an American astronomer most famous for his discovery of Hoag's Object, a type of ring galaxy, in 1950.

Biography 
Hoag was born January 28, 1921, in Ann Arbor, Michigan. The son of Lynne Arthur Hoag (Harvard Medical School, Cornell, and University of Michigan faculty member) and wife Wylma Wood Hoag. He had two sisters, Mary Alice (born 1922) and Elizabeth Ruth (born 1919), a son named Tom, and a daughter named Stefanie. His mother and sister Mary (aged 3) died on June 1, 1926, when the Washington Irving was rammed by an oil barge and sunk on the North River.

His interest in astronomy started early on. In 1942, he graduated with a degree in physics from Brown University. Upon graduation, he went to work at the Naval Ordnance Laboratory. He received his Ph.D. in Astronomy from Harvard in 1953 under Bart Bok. In 1955, he moved to Arizona to become the director of the Flagstaff Station of the USNO, where he worked on several research programs.

In 1966, he was appointed director of the stellar division of Kitt Peak National Observatory (KPNO), where he helped develop the 4-meter Nicholas U. Mayall Telescope. In 1977, he became director of the Lowell Observatory in Flagstaff, Arizona. He was noted for his work in photoelectric and photographic photometry. Hoag also developed astronomical sites and instruments, and he researched quasi-stellar objects. He retired as director of the Lowell Observatory in 1986. He died on July 17, 1999, in Tucson, Arizona.

Awards and honors 
Asteroid 3225 Hoag, discovered by Carolyn and Eugene Shoemaker, was named after him in December 1985. He also discovered Hoag's Object in 1950, a nearly perfect ring galaxy.

References 
 

1921 births
1999 deaths
20th-century American astronomers
Brown University alumni
Harvard University alumni